The Sony α7R III (model ILCE-7RM3) is a full-frame mirrorless interchangeable-lens camera manufactured by Sony. It was announced on 25 October 2017 as the successor to the Sony α7R II launched two years prior. The camera shares many features with the α7R II, including the same 42.2 MP resolution for still photography. It was superseded by the Sony α7R IV in July 2019.

Camera does not include optical low-pass (anti-aliasing) filter

Improvements over α7R II
Several improvements were made compared to the α7R II, including the following:

 Improved dynamic range due to lower noise in sensor readout
 425 contrast-detect autofocus points, up from 25 in the α7R II
 Altered button layout reminiscent of the α9
 Improved autofocus performance
 Improved battery life due to larger battery
 Dual SD card slots, compared to a single slot in the α7R II. However, the slots do not exactly match. One is an SD slot (UHS-I/II compliant), the other is a dual SD (UHS-I compliant) and Sony Memory Stick Duo slot.
 Improved shutter mechanism to reduce shutter-induced shake
 Pixel shift multi-shot mode that combines exposures taken on each subpixel of the Bayer filter, improving overall image quality

See also
Comparison of Sony α7 cameras
Sony α9
Exmor R

References

https://www.sony.com/electronics/interchangeable-lens-cameras/ilce-7rm3a/specifications

External links 
 Sony α7R III DPReview
 Sony α7R III compared with Nikon D850 DPReview

α7R III
Cameras introduced in 2017
Full-frame mirrorless interchangeable lens cameras